Daana Paani may refer to:

 Daana Paani (1953 film), Indian Hindi language film, directed by V. M. Vyas
 Daana Paani (1989 film), Indian Hindi language film, directed by Deven Verma
 Daana Paani (2018 film), Indian Punjabi language film, directed by Tarnvir Singh Jagpal